The 2017–18 Mercer Bears women's basketball team represents Mercer University during the 2017–18 NCAA Division I women's basketball season. The Bears, led by eighth-year head coach Susie Gardner, play their home games at the Hawkins Arena as members of the Southern Conference (SoCon). They finished the season 30–3, 14–0 in Southern Conference play win the Southern Conference regular season. They won the SoCon women's tournament for the first time in school history and earns their first automatic trip to the NCAA women's tournament where they lost to Georgia in the first round.

Roster

Schedule

 
|-
!colspan=9 style=| Non-conference regular season

|-
!colspan=9 style=| SoCon Regular Season

|-
!colspan=9 style=| SoCon Tournament

|-
!colspan=9 style=| NCAA Women's Tournament

Rankings
2017–18 NCAA Division I women's basketball rankings

References

Mercer Bears women's basketball seasons
Mercer
Mercer
Mercer Bears
Mercer Bears